Gladys Portugues (born September 30, 1957) is an American former professional female bodybuilder and actress. As a bodybuilder, she twice placed in the top 10 in the Ms. Olympia contest. She was married to Belgian actor and martial artist Jean-Claude van Damme.

Personal life
Portugues of puertorican parents has said that she was inspired to start her own bodybuilding and weight training regimen while attending Marymount Manhattan College, when she saw Rachel McLish on television winning the Ms. Olympia title. 

In 1987, at the age of thirty, Portugues married Belgian martial artist and actor Jean-Claude van Varenberg. The couple divorced in 1992, but remarried in 1999. They have two children: Kristopher van Varenberg (born 1987) and Bianca Brigitte (born 1990). Her husband is professionally known as Jean-Claude Van Damme.

Filmography

TV

Books
Hard Bodies Express, Portugues, Dell; Reissue 1988, 
Hard Bodies, Portugues and Vedral, Dell; Reissue edition 1986,

References

External links

1957 births
Living people
American female bodybuilders
American people of Puerto Rican descent
Place of birth missing (living people)
Actresses from New York City
Professional bodybuilders